Ishiro may refer to:
 Chamacoco language, or Ishiro, a language of South America
 Chamacoco, or Ishiro, an ethnic group of South America
 Ishirō Honda (1911–1993), Japanese film director

See also 
 Ichirō, a Japanese name

Language and nationality disambiguation pages